OpenSecrets is a nonprofit organization based in Washington, D.C., that tracks data on campaign finance and lobbying. It was created from a merger of the Center for Responsive Politics (CRP) and the National Institute on Money in Politics (NIMP).

History
The Center for Responsive Politics was founded in 1983 by retired U.S. Senators Frank Church of Idaho, of the Democratic Party, and Hugh Scott of Pennsylvania, of the Republican Party. It was officially incorporated on February 1, 1984. In the 1980s, Church and Scott launched a "money-in-politics" project, whose outcome consisted of large, printed books. Their first book, published in 1988, analyzed spending patterns in congressional elections from 1974 through 1986, including 1986 soft money contributions in five states. It was titled Spending in Congressional Elections: A Never-Ending Spiral.

In 2021, the CRP announced its merger with the National Institute on Money in Politics. The combined organization is known as OpenSecrets. The merger was funded by the Hewlett Foundation.

National Institute on Money in Politics

The National Institute on Money in Politics was an American nonprofit organization that tracked campaign finance data. The organization published the Follow The Money website, where it compiled political funding information from government disclosure agencies. The Institute advocated for stricter regulation of political donations, including increased disclosure of political spending. The Institute believed that states should require independent political spenders to disclose all information about election-related communications.

Activities
In 1996, CRP launched its online counterpart, OpenSecrets.org.

CRP hosts a revolving door database which documents the individuals who have passed between the public sector and K Street.

In 2015, The News & Observer published an op-ed by Robert Maguire, the political nonprofits investigator at CRP, that was critical of Carolina Rising, a 501(c)(4) social welfare organization (i.e. an organization considered by the IRS to operate exclusively for the promotion of social welfare) for spending $4.7 million in 2014 on political ads in support of Thom Tillis, Senate candidate from North Carolina.

CRP reported that President Trump's re-election campaign was financially related to the rally that occurred on January 6, 2021 preceding the 2021 United States Capitol attack.

Funding
Major donors to the Center for Responsive Politics include the Sunlight Foundation, The Pew Charitable Trusts, the Carnegie Corporation of New York, Open Society Foundations, the Joyce Foundation, and the Ford Foundation. At the end of 2017, the organization reported $1.44 million in annual revenue and $2.92 million in net assets.

Funders of the National Institute on Money in Politics included the Ford Foundation, the MacArthur Foundation, the Open Society Foundations, the Rockefeller Foundation, the William and Flora Hewlett Foundation, the Bauman Foundation, and the Sunlight Foundation.

Staff
Sheila Krumholz has been the organization's executive director since December 2006, having previously served as the group's research director. She joined the organization in 1989.

References

External links

Charity Navigator rating
GuideStar profile
FollowTheMoney.org

Government watchdog groups in the United States
Lobbying in the United States
Non-profit organizations based in Washington, D.C.
Open government in the United States